Berlin Yorckstraße is an S-Bahn and U-Bahn station located in the Schöneberg locality of central Berlin, Germany.

Overview
The eponymous street is named after Generalfeldmarschall Ludwig Yorck von Wartenburg. Bahnhof Yorckstraße consists of two neighbouring S-Bahn stations and an underground station: 

The western Yorckstraße (Großgörschenstraße) S-Bahn station on the S1 line (DS100: BGGS) was opened as Großgörschenstraße in 1891 with the new Wannseebahn rapid transit line running from Potsdamer Bahnhof to Wannsee. Originally located south of the small Großgörschenstraße the platform was demolished and shifted northwards to its current position at the Yorckstraße with the opening of the Nord-Süd Bahn tunnel in 1939. As the "Germania" plans included a general reorganization of Berlin's railway system, only a provisional station with wooden pillars was erected that nevertheless persists until today.

 
The eastern Yorckstraße S-Bahn station at the S2/S25/S26 line, opened in 1903 on the Anhalter Bahn and Dresdener Bahn line departing from Anhalter Bahnhof.

The adjacent Yorckstraße U-Bahn station of the U7 was built in 1971 by R.G. Rümmler. The underground station has two exits one each to one of the two S-Bahn stations, which are otherwise only connected by a short walk or (in the eastward direction) by bus. The next underground station in eastward direction is Möckernbrücke, where transfer is available to U1.

References

External links

Station information 

Berlin S-Bahn stations
U7 (Berlin U-Bahn) stations
Buildings and structures in Tempelhof-Schöneberg
Berlin Yorckstrasse
Berlin Yorckstrasse
Berlin Yorckstrasse